Togo's culture reflects the influences of its 37 tribal ethnic groups, the largest and most influential of which are the Ewe, Mina, and Kabye.  French is the official language of Togo, but many native African languages are spoken there as well. Despite the influence of Western religion, more than half of the people of Togo follow native animistic practices and beliefs.

Ewe statuary is characterized by its famous statuettes which illustrate the worship of the twins, the ibéji. Sculptures and hunting trophies were used rather than the more ubiquitous African masks. The wood-carvers of Kloto are famous for their "chains of marriage": two characters are connected by rings drawn from only one piece of wood.

The dyed fabric batiks of the artisanal center of Kloto represent stylized and colored scenes of ancient everyday life. The loincloths used in the ceremonies of the tisserands of Assahoun are famous. Works of the painter Sokey Edorh are inspired by the immense arid extents, swept by the harmattan, and where the laterite keeps the prints of the men and the animals. The plastics technician Paul Ahyi is internationally recognized today. He practises the "zota", a kind of pyroengraving, and his monumental achievements decorate Lomé.

See also
 Mass media in Togo
 Music of Togo

References

CIA World Factbook: Togo
U.N. Togolese Mission (French)
Lonely Planet's Togo Culture page